Te Mārua (previously also known as Te Marua) is the easternmost urban suburb of Upper Hutt. For reasons of location and distance from the city, the area is often classified as rural.  Te Mārua is well known for its Plateau Reserve where remnants of the old Rimutaka Railway path can be found, which now form part of a historic walk. Mt Climie, the highest peak of the Remutaka Range, can also be reached from the reserve.   The suburb is also the location of the Wellington Speedway, a nationally important venue for stock car racing, and of the Wellington Naturist Club's club grounds, venue of the historic 2016 World Congress of the International Naturist Federation.

Te Mārua is situated on State Highway 2, and is the last significant township (and shop) on the road before it reaches the head of the Hutt Valley and crosses the Remutaka Range into the Wairarapa. Te Mārua is situated in the original floodplain of the Hutt River and parts, particularly the Golf course, have been subject to flooding.

Just north of Te Mārua is the Te Mārua water treatment plant and the twin Stuart Macaskill Lakes. Water is taken from the Hutt River at Kaitoke, and either goes directly to the treatment plant or is stored in the lakes for future use. The water treatment plant supplies 40 percent of Wellington's water requirements, including all of Upper Hutt, Manor Park and Stokes Valley in Lower Hutt, all of Porirua, and the northern and western suburbs of Wellington City.

Te Mārua residents are represented by the local community body, the Upper Hutt Rural Residents Association, and served by Maymorn railway station.

In December 2019, the approved official geographic name of the locality was gazetted as "Te Mārua".

Demographics

Te Mārua had a population of 975 at the 2018 New Zealand census, an increase of 6 people (0.6%) since the 2013 census, and an increase of 57 people (6.2%) since the 2006 census. There were 351 households. There were 510 males and 468 females, giving a sex ratio of 1.09 males per female. The median age was 42.2 years (compared with 37.4 years nationally), with 189 people (19.4%) aged under 15 years, 165 (16.9%) aged 15 to 29, 507 (52.0%) aged 30 to 64, and 111 (11.4%) aged 65 or older.

Ethnicities were 89.2% European/Pākehā, 15.7% Māori, 4.6% Pacific peoples, 1.5% Asian, and 1.5% other ethnicities (totals add to more than 100% since people could identify with multiple ethnicities).

The proportion of people born overseas was 20.0%, compared with 27.1% nationally.

Although some people objected to giving their religion, 56.0% had no religion, 30.2% were Christian, 0.3% were Hindu, 0.6% were Buddhist and 4.3% had other religions.

Of those at least 15 years old, 123 (15.6%) people had a bachelor or higher degree, and 129 (16.4%) people had no formal qualifications. The median income was $40,600, compared with $31,800 nationally. The employment status of those at least 15 was that 456 (58.0%) people were employed full-time, 129 (16.4%) were part-time, and 21 (2.7%) were unemployed.

Education

Plateau School, located in Te Mārua, is a co-educational state primary school for Year 1 to 6 students.

References

Suburbs of Upper Hutt
Populated places on Te Awa Kairangi / Hutt River